Gisela May (31 May 1924 – 2 December 2016) was a German actress and singer.

Early life
May was born in Wetzlar, Germany. Both her mother, Kate May, and her father, Ferdinand May, were writers. She studied at the drama school in Leipzig from 1942 to 1944. She was employed for nine years at various theatres, including the State Theatre of Schwerin and the State Theatre in Halle. Starting in 1951, she performed at the Deutsches Theater in Berlin, where she played a variety of roles.

Career
In 1962, May moved to Bertolt Brecht's theatre group, the Berliner Ensemble, and stayed for 30 years. While there she played a variety of roles, including Madame Cabet in The Days of the Commune, Mrs Peachum in The Threepenny Opera, Mrs Kopecka in Schweik in the Second World War, and Mother Courage in Mother Courage and Her Children.

May was known as a diverse performer. In the 1970s she performed the lead role in the musical Hello, Dolly! in Berlin, and later she starred in the television series Addelheid and her Murderers. She also performed solo concerto concerts internationally, including at New York's Carnegie Hall and the Milan Scala.

From 1992, she freelanced, often working at Berlin's Renaissance Theatre.

Awards
1962 Clara-Zetkin-Medaille
1991 Deutscher Filmpreis (German Film Award) Film Award in Gold for outstanding individual achievement: Category actress for:  (1990)
2004 Bundesverdienstkreuz (Order of Merit of the Federal Republic of Germany)

References

External links

May's personal webpage copy from the internet archive

1924 births
2016 deaths
People from Wetzlar
People from the Rhine Province
German stage actresses
German women singers
Recipients of the Patriotic Order of Merit
Recipients of the National Prize of East Germany
Best Actress German Film Award winners
Officers Crosses of the Order of Merit of the Federal Republic of Germany
Recipients of the Order of Merit of Berlin
Members of the Academy of Arts, Berlin